Robert Đặng Văn (Vietnamese name: Đặng Văn Việt; born 27 August 1984) is a retired Vietnamese–Slovak footballer who played as a defender He was born to Vietnamese father and Slovak mother.

See also
 List of Vietnam footballers born outside Vietnam

References 

1984 births
Living people
Vietnamese footballers
Vietnam international footballers
Vietnamese expatriate footballers
Haiphong FC players
Xuan Thanh Saigon Cement FC players
Thanh Hóa FC players
Becamex Binh Duong FC players
V.League 1 players
Slovak people of Vietnamese descent
Vietnamese people of Slovak descent
Sportspeople of Vietnamese descent
Association football defenders
Place of birth missing (living people)